Claudio Sorrentino (18 July 1945 – 16 February 2021) was an Italian actor and voice actor.

Biography
Born in Rome and the second child of Arduino and Anna Sorrentino, Sorrentino began his career at the age of five acting at the "Grand Hotel di Roma", singing the song "O mese de Rose", composed by Roberto Murolo. After his performance, Lilly D'Eramo (Nanni Eramo's wife) asked Claudio's mother to take him and his sisters to a specialized school. At the age of six, he interpreted "Zi Dima" in Luigi Pirandello's opera Giara and "Medoro" in E. De Filippo's Sic Sic. He performed in several theatres in Rome.

Sorrentino later acted in the opera La vita con il padre e la madre with Paolo Stoppa, Lino Morelli and Corrado Pani. During that time, Sorrentino started his career as a voice actor, covering a role in the film L'ultima Carovana.

As a dubbing artist, Sorrentino was the official Italian voice of John Travolta and Mel Gibson. Other actors he dubbed include Bruce Willis, Sylvester Stallone, Willem Dafoe, Ryan O'Neal, Ron Howard, Jeff Bridges, Mickey Rourke and many more. In his animated roles, he voiced Dodger in the Italian dub of Oliver & Company.

Personal life
At the age of 23, Claudio married Manuela Artari, to whom he was married until his death. He also had three sisters, including voice actress Liliana Sorrentino.

Sorrentino died on 16 February 2021, at the age of 75, after contracting COVID-19 during the pandemic in Italy.

References

External links
  
 

1945 births
2021 deaths
Male actors from Rome
Italian male film actors
Italian male voice actors
Italian male television actors
Italian male stage actors
Italian male child actors
Italian male radio actors
Italian television presenters
Italian voice directors
20th-century Italian male actors
21st-century Italian male actors
Deaths from the COVID-19 pandemic in Lazio